The Red Night is a 1921 German silent film directed by Jaap Speyer.

Cast

References

Bibliography

External links

1921 films
Films of the Weimar Republic
German silent feature films
Films directed by Jaap Speyer
German black-and-white films